Farid Sid (born 27 March 1979) is a French rugby union player. His position is Wing and he currently plays for USA Perpignan in the Top 14. He began his career with home-town club Perpignan and moved to Colomiers in 2003. He spent a season with Colomiers and then transferred to Brive, where he spent four seasons. He returned to USA Perpignan in 2008, helping them to the Bouclier de Brennus in 2009.

Honours
Top 14 Champion – 2008–09

References

1979 births
Living people
French rugby union players
Sportspeople from Perpignan
USA Perpignan players
CA Brive players
Rugby union wings
20th-century French people
21st-century French people